Falls Township may refer to:

 Falls Township, Cerro Gordo County, Iowa
 Falls Township, Chase County, Kansas
 Falls Township, Sumner County, Kansas
 Falls Township, Hocking County, Ohio
 Falls Township, Muskingum County, Ohio
 Falls Township, Bucks County, Pennsylvania
 Falls Township, Wyoming County, Pennsylvania

Township name disambiguation pages